Orman may refer to:

People 
 
Aldona Orman (born 1968), Polish actress
Alen Orman (born 1978), Austrian football player
Charles Orman (1859–1927), British cricketer and soldier
Fikret Orman (born 1967), Turkish businessman
Greg Orman (born 1968), American businessman and senatorial candidate from Kansas
Jack Orman, American television writer, producer and director
James Bradley Orman (1849–1919), American politician and railroad builder
John Orman (1949–2009), American political scientist
Kate Orman (born 1968), Australian author
Lorraine Orman (born 1948), New Zealand writer
Miles Orman, American actor
Olga Orman (1943–2021), Dutch-Aruban writer, poet and storyteller
Rick Orman (born 1948), Canadian politician
Roscoe Orman (born 1944), American actor
Suze Orman (born 1951), American financial advisor, author, motivational speaker, and television host

Places 
Egypt
Orman Garden, botanical garden in Giza

North Macedonia
Orman, Gjorče Petrov
Orman, Ohrid

Romania
Orman (river), a tributary of the Someșul Mic in Cluj County
Orman, a village in Iclod Commune, Cluj County

Syria
Orman, Syria, a village in the al-Suwayda Governorate

United States
Orman House a state park and historic site in Apalachicola, Florida

See also 
 Van Orman, a surname